Al-Mahdi Ahmad (1633 – July 10, 1681) was an Imam of Yemen, who ruled in 1676–1681. He belonged to the Qasimid family that was descended from Muhammad.

Struggle for the imamate
Ahmad was a son of al-Hasan bin al-Qasim (d. 1639), a brother of the former imam al-Mutawakkil Isma'il. In the reign of his uncle, in 1658, he led forces that loosely incorporated Hadramaut in the Yemeni kingdom. When al-Mutawakkil Isma'il died, the imamate was claimed by Ahmad. He had, however, to fight his cousin and rival al-Qasim who controlled Shaharah, an almost impregnable fortress north of San'a. Ahmad collected forces which besieged Shaharah and forced al-Qasim to accept his claim.

Reign
At his accession, the imam was already a mature man in his upper forties. He upheld the Yemeni suzerainty in Hadramaut, and was reported to be a pious figure. His residence was al-Ghiras north-east of San'a. In 1679 the imam expelled the Jewish population from San'a and the surrounding regions, being forced to settle in Mawza close to Mocha, in what was then known as the Mawza Exile. The Jews were later allowed to move to Qa'a al-Yahud (the new Jewish Quarter), a suburb situated two kilometers from San'a. At the death of the imam in 1681, his son Muhammad was prevented from assuming the imamate due to counter-claims by relatives in Rada, Shaharah, Sa'dah and Mansura. Through mediation of the Ulama (religious scholars), one of these, al-Mu'ayyad Muhammad II, took power.

See also

 History of Yemen
 Imams of Yemen
 Jews of Yemen

References

Zaydi imams of Yemen
1633 births
1681 deaths
17th-century Arabs
Antisemitism in Yemen